Ancistrus parecis is a species of catfish in the family Loricariidae. It is native to South America, where it occurs in the Tapajós River basin in Brazil. Its specific epithet refers to the Parecis Plateau, where the type specimen was collected. The species reaches 6 cm (2.4 inches) SL.

References 

Catfish of South America
Fish described in 2005
parecis